National Road 27 (abbreviated as EO27) is a single carriageway road in central Greece.  It connects the Greek National Road 3 at Bralos, south of Lamia, with the GR-48 near Itea, passing through Amfissa. It is part of the European route E65. The road passes through the regional units Phocis and Phthiotis.

Route
National Road 27 passes through the following places:
Bralos
Gravia
Amfissa

27
Roads in Central Greece